The Holderness Gazette (established 1910) is a weekly newspaper distributed to the communities of Holderness in the East Riding of Yorkshire, England.

The paper's office is situated at 1 Seaside Road in Withernsea.

References

External links
 holderness-gazette.co.uk - Official website

1910 establishments in England
Newspapers established in 1910
Newspapers published in Yorkshire
Holderness
Withernsea